These are the official results of the Women's 4x400 metres event at the 1982 European Championships in Athens, Greece. The final was held at Olympic Stadium "Spiros Louis" on 11 September 1982.

Medalists

Results

Final
11 September

Participation
According to an unofficial count, 32 athletes from 8 countries participated in the event.

 (4)
 (4)
 (4)
 (4)
 (4)
 (4)
 (4)
 (4)

See also
 1978 Women's European Championships 4 × 400 m Relay (Prague)
 1980 Women's Olympic 4 × 400 m Relay (Moscow)
 1983 Women's World Championships 4 × 400 m Relay (Helsinki)
 1984 Women's Olympic 4 × 400 m Relay (Los Angeles)
 1986 Women's European Championships 4 × 400 m Relay (Stuttgart)
 1987 Women's World Championships 4 × 400 m Relay (Rome)
 1988 Women's Olympic 4 × 400 m Relay (Seoul)
 1990 Women's European Championships 4 × 400 m Relay (Split)

References

External links
 Results

4 x 400 metres relay
4 x 400 metres relay at the European Athletics Championships
1982 in women's athletics